Lewis Coler Asprilla (born 27 May 1972) is a retired Colombian athlete who specialised in the long jump. He won several medals on regional level.

His personal best jump is 7.96 metres, set in 1999 in Bogotá. This is the current national record.

Competition record

References

1972 births
Living people
Colombian male long jumpers
Athletes (track and field) at the 1999 Pan American Games
Pan American Games competitors for Colombia
20th-century Colombian people